Michael L. Testa Jr. (born May 1, 1976) is an American Republican Party politician who represents the 1st Legislative District in the New Jersey Senate. Testa was elected to the state senate on November 5, 2019 in the special election to fill the remaining 14 months of the unfinished term of Jeff Van Drew, who won a seat to the United States House of Representatives in 2018. Testa was sworn into office on December 5, 2019.

Early life
His father is an Italian-American and his mother is a Polish Jew who was born to parents who had met each other in a concentration camp.

Early career 
Testa was elected as chairman of the Cumberland County GOP in 2014, after serving as vice chairman for three years. From 2006 to 2008, Testa was a member of the Vineland Downtown Improvement District/Main Street Vineland. Testa was formerly a chairman of the Big Brothers Big Sisters of Cumberland and Salem Counties, and board president of Vineland Regional Dance.

New Jersey Senate 

On November 5, 2018, 1st District State Senator Jeff Van Drew won a seat to the United States House of Representatives, creating a vacancy for his state senate seat. On November 20, Testa announced he would run for the special election for the remainder of Van Drew's State Senate term. President Donald Trump recorded robocalls for Testa in his state senate election, which were sent out on the day before election day.

Tenure 
Testa was sworn into the Senate on December 5, 2019, by Senate President Steve Sweeney. After Rep. Jeff Van Drew switched to the Republican Party, Testa endorsed Van Drew.

Committee assignments 
Budget and Appropriations
Labor
In October 2019, President Donald Trump named Testa, along with State Senate Minority Whip Joseph Pennacchio, as co-chairs for the president's re-election bid.

Personal life 
Testa and his wife Julie, a former Miss New Jersey, live in Vineland  with their three children, Eva Marie, Sarah, and Tripp.

Electoral history

References

External links
Legislative webpage

1976 births
21st-century American politicians
Living people
Democratic Party New Jersey state senators
People from Vineland, New Jersey
Politicians from Cumberland County, New Jersey
Temple University Beasley School of Law alumni
Villanova University School of Law alumni